Jang-geum (fl. early 16th century) was reputedly the first female Royal Physician in Korean history. She was mentioned 10 times in the Annals of the Joseon Dynasty. It is known that King Jungjong was pleased with Jang-geum's medical knowledge and trusted her with taking care of the royal family. Henceforth, Jang-geum became the third highest-ranking officer in the Court, and was granted the use of Dae (which means "great" in Korean) before her first name.

Some sources attest to Jang-geum as a real person and it is still a topic of debate among scholars. 

Jang-Geum is considered an important person in Korean history, although there is little information about her. Since the king trusted her so much, people started to respect her and give her attention.

Mentions in Annals of the Joseon Dynasty
Mentions of "Jang-geum (長今)", sometimes alongside the title "female doctor" (uinyeo; 醫女), were noted on 10 occasions:

 04 April 1515: Some court officers sent petitions to King Jungjong to severely punish all the uinyeo that had attended to the recently deceased Queen (Queen Janggyeong), including Jang-geum. Queen Janggyeong (Jungjong's 2nd wife) died past midnight on 16 March due to post-partum complications resulting from the birth of the legitimate heir (the future King Injong; 10 March). This was the first recorded entry as well as mention of Jang-geum's name in the Annals.
 05 April 1515: In reply to the above petition, King Jungjong refused: "Jang-geum deserved a big credit for her role in the safe childbirth (of the Queen), but I have never rewarded her for her actions until now, because of other affairs. Now you (the court officers) are telling me to punish her because the Queen is dead, but I won't do that as well as I won't reward her."
 24 September 1522: Jungjong was recorded to have rewarded the staff of the medical department after the Queen Mother (Queen Jeonghyeon) recovered from an illness. Jang-geum (as well as fellow uinyeo Shin-bi) was rewarded 10 sacks of rice & 10 sacks of beans.
 08 January 1525: Jungjong commented, after an illness: "[...] However, Dae Jang-geum (大長今) was better than any other uinyeo. As a result, she was permitted to look after the King". This was the first recorded instance of the title "dae" (大 "great") attached to Jang-geum's name in the Annals.
 06 March 1533: Jungjong commented on his state of health: "I have recovered from a sickness of several months. The royal physicians deserve praise and reward. [...] Uinyeo Dae Jang-geum and Kye-geum will each be rewarded 15 sacks of rice, 15 sacks of beans, and 10 bolts of cloth."
 21 February 1544: Jungjong commented on an order: "I haven't been able to execute my duties for a long time since I caught a cold. A few days ago, I attended an academic seminar (to discuss philosophies), but the cold weather made my condition worse. I already told the royal physicians Park Se-geo and Hong Chim, as well as uinyeo Dae Jang-geum, Eun-bi, and the rest to discuss about the prescription with the medical officer-in-charge. [...]"
 02 March 1544: In relation to above, Jungjong later recovered from his cold, and was recorded to have rewarded the royal physicians and their staff. Dae Jang-geum was rewarded 5 sacks of rice and beans. This was the last record where the title "dae" was affixed to Jang-geum's name in the Annals.
 09 November 1544: The Annals recorded a conversation between the high-ranking ministers of the court and Jang-geum, regarding their enquiry on Jungjong's health. Wherein afterwards the physicians Park Se-geo and Hong Chim examined Jungjong's pulse and prescribed medications. Jang-geum was quoted: "His Majesty slept around midnight yesterday, and has also slept for a short time at dawn. He just passed his urine, but has been constipated for around 3 days."
 10 November 1544: Jungjong commented (in relation to some relatives sending their written regards for his well-being): "I'm still constipated. What prescription should be made is under discussion. The female physician knows all about my condition," referring to the previous entry, where Jang-geum's reply was inserted as a complementary side-note.
 13 November 1544: The Annals reported that Jungjong has recovered, which was transmitted to ministers who came by in greeting. Afterwards Jungjong granted all of the medical officers in attendance a holiday. Jungjong particularly mentioned that Jang-geum visited him in the morning, and told her that he had passed his stool and that he had felt immense relief. This was the last recorded entry as well as direct mention of Jang-geum's name in the Annals. 16 days later (29 November), Jungjong passed away.

Mention in other medical annals
Jang-geum was also mentioned in a book title "Yi dynasty Medical Officer's Journal". The following was a text regarding Jang-geum's origins and achievements, as recorded in the medical journal.

"Medical Lady Jang-geum, whose origins cannot be traced, received the right to be called "Dae Jang-geum" under an edict issued by the 11th King of Korea, Jungjong, in the 18th year of his reign [1524-1525]. At that time, there was no precedent of a Medical Lady treating a King, but the King trusted in Jang-geum's method of treating illness with food. Jang-geum, with the granting of the right to use "Dae" in her name, is certainly an epic lady whose name will be recorded in the history books."

Popular culture
 Portrayed by Lee Young-ae in the 2003–2004 MBC TV series Dae Jang Geum.
 Portrayed by Kim Mi-kyung in the 2013 KBS2 TV series The Fugitive of Joseon.
Portrayed in the 2016 MBC TV series Flowers of the Prison 
 It's a nickname often used for female idols that are good at cooking.

See also
Joseon Dynasty
List of Koreans

References

16th-century Korean physicians
Court physicians
16th-century Korean women
16th-century women scientists